Yvonne Georgi (29 October 1903 – 25 January 1975) was a German dancer, choreographer and ballet mistress. She was known for her comedic talents and her extraordinary jumping ability. In her roles as a dancer, choreographer, and ballet mistress, she was an influential figure in dance for decades.

Biography

Georgi was born in Leipzig, Germany on 29 October 1903. She did not have any formal training in dance until she was seventeen and was "discovered" during a performance at a friend's home. Though she had initially planned to study librarianship, she soon realized  She went on to study at the Dalcroze Institute in Hellerau in 1920 and then the Wigman School in Dresden in 1921. Along with Gret Palucca and Hanya Holm, she was one of the best-known students of Mary Wigman and Robert Gergi. 

She debuted in Leipzig in 1923, touring as a soloist across Europe and North America. She also toured with Harald Kreutzberg in the US. She had numerous première performances, among them the Electronic Ballet in 1957 to the music of Henk Badings. She died in Hannover.

References 

German ballerinas
Ballet choreographers
Ballet mistresses
German women choreographers
1903 births
1975 deaths
20th-century German ballet dancers